Noureddine Moukrim (born 16 February 1966) is a Moroccan footballer who played as a defender.

Honours 
Royal Antwerp

 Belgian Cup: 1991-92
 UEFA Cup Winners' Cup: 1992-93 (runners-up)

References

External links
 

Living people
1966 births
Moroccan footballers
Morocco international footballers
Association football midfielders
K.V.K. Tienen-Hageland players
Royal Antwerp F.C. players
Germania Teveren players
Union Royale Namur Fosses-La-Ville players
Belgian Pro League players
Challenger Pro League players
Belgian Third Division players
Regionalliga players
People from Khemisset